Grass Roots is a proposed British-American adult clay film based on the Fabulous Furry Freak Brothers underground comic strip created by Gilbert Shelton.

Plot
The government develops genetically modified marijuana as part of the War on Drugs, and Norbert the Nark accidentally gives the prototype to the Fabulous Furry Freak Brothers. With the government on their trail, Phineas T. Phreakears, Freewheelin' Franklin Freek, and Fat Freddy Freekowtski are forced to leave town, acquiring a remote plot of land in order to fulfill their dream of retiring to grow marijuana in the country. Three women join the Freak Brothers' commune, but because gender politics have changed since the 1970s, they do not see eye to eye with the Brothers' free love philosophy.

History

Prior to Grass Roots, there had been several attempts to film the stories. There was even an unauthorized pornographic film titled Up in Flames, which "ripped off the Freak Brothers, Mr. Natural  all in one go."

In 1979, Rip Off Press received $250,000 from Universal Pictures for a five-year option on a live-action film based on the characters. Although a script was written, the film was never done. It was rumored that Universal bought the rights in order to prevent competition against the Cheech & Chong franchise. Over the next 25 years there were several more options taken on film rights, but none of them went to production.

In 2006, Celluloid Dreams, in association with bolexbrothers and X Filme, began production on an animated film based on the Freak Brothers comics. Grass Roots was going to be directed by Dave Borthwick, whose previous credits include The Secret Adventures of Tom Thumb and The Magic Roundabout. Cinematographer Dave Alex Riddett previously worked as the cinematographer on several Aardman Animations productions, including the Wallace and Gromit shorts and feature film, and Chicken Run. Test animation was released through Celluloid Dreams' official website. As of 2012, the film was still in pre-production limbo, with the producers still unable to raise the necessary budget; they are reportedly adapting the story into a stage musical.

2021 Freak Brothers animated series 
In 2019, it was announced that a Fabulous Furry Freak Brothers animated television series was being developed. It was retitled as Freak Brothers. Mark Canton and Courtney Solomon serve as executive producers, while Alan Cohen and Alan Freedland are the showrunners. The first season consists of eight 22-minute episodes. The series was released on Tubi on November 14, 2021.

See also
List of stop-motion films
List of animated feature films

References

2000s stop-motion animated films
American animated comedy films
Animated films based on comics
American adult animated films
British independent films
American independent films
The Fabulous Furry Freak Brothers
British films about cannabis
Films based on American comics
2000s unfinished films
Cancelled films
Unreleased American films
Unfinished animated films
2000s English-language films
Films directed by Dave Borthwick
2000s American films
2000s British films